Security Systems F.C. are a football club from Otse, Botswana, currently playing in the Botswana Premier League.

History
Systems won promotion to the 2012-13 Botswana Premier League, but failed to pay the subscription fee and were denied a spot in the top flight. They then lost to BR Highlanders in the promotion playoffs in 2013-14.

Systems were then deregistered after the 2013-14 season and merged with second division Tsholofelo Rolling Boys. Rolling Boys were promoted again after the 2016 season and changed their name back to Security Systems for their first season in the top flight.

References

Football clubs in Botswana